1942 is an alternate history novel written by Robert Conroy. It was first published, as an e-
book, by Ballantine Books on February 24, 2009, with a hardcover edition following from the same publisher in March 2009. The novel won the 2009 Sidewise Award for Alternate History.

Plot
In the wake of an attack on Pearl Harbor that is far more successful than in reality, the novel depicts a fictitious Japanese invasion and conquest of Hawaii in late 1941 and the ensuing struggle by the United States to regain the islands in 1942.

See also

 Days of Infamy series

References

American alternate history novels
Sidewise Award for Alternate History winning works
Novels about World War II alternate histories
Novels by Robert Conroy
Ballantine Books books
Novels set in Hawaii
novels
Fiction set in 1941
Fiction set in 1942